Koha may refer to:

 Koha (custom), a New Zealand Māori custom of gift giving
 Koha (software), an open-source integrated library system
 Koha, Iran, a village
 Kalju Koha, Estonian politician
 Koharu Kusumi, a Japanese pop singer
 KOHA-LD, a low-power television station (channel 27) licensed to serve Omaha, Nebraska, United States